The genus Savageoceras is a barrandeoceratid first known from the Middle Silurian of Illinois consisting of rapidly enlarging, depressed cyrtocones with a trapezoidal section; ventral side wider and flatter than dorsal; sides converging on dorsum. Sutures have slight lateral and ventral lobes and ventrolateral saddles. The surface is covered by transverse striae and has rib-like rings that are more prominent at the ventrolateral shoulders but otherwise vaguely defined. The siphuncle is central; interior unknown.

References

 Sweet, W.C. Nautiloidea - Barrandeocerida. Treatise on Invertebrate Paleontology, Part K. Geological Soc. of America and Univ. of Kansas press.

Prehistoric nautiloid genera
Tarphycerida